Fuzzy Warbles Volume 7 is the seventh volume in the Fuzzy Warbles series, released in September 2006. The Fuzzy Warbles Series brings together demos, rarities and side projects from XTC founding member Andy Partridge.

Track listing
All songs written by Andy Partridge.

 "2 Rainbeau Melt" – 3:36
 "Thrill Pill" – 0:46
 "Sonic Boom" – 2:50
 "I'm Unbecome" – 4:04
 "Ballet for a Rainy Day" – 3:12
 "1000 Umbrellas" – 1:39
 "Ejac in a Box (MGOO)" – 3:08
 "C Side" – 0:20
 "Seagulls Screaming Kiss Her Kiss Her" – 3:38
 "Ladybird" – 5:15
 "Candymine" – 2:24
 "Visit to the Doctor" – 3:29
 "Cherry In Your Tree" – 2:53
 "Desert Island" – 5:14
 "Scarecrow People" – 4:17
 "Hold Me My Daddy" – 4:13
 "Books are Burning" – 4:23
 "Bobba De Boop De Ba De Boobay" – 0:31
 "Open a Can of Human Beans" – 4:44

Personnel
Andy Partridge – instruments and vocals on all tracks
Dave Gregory – sitar guitar and Mellotron on 19
Ian Gregory – drums on 19
Colin Moulding – bass on 19

Credits
All songs were recorded at Andy's home except 19, partly recorded at Idea Studio, Wiltshire.
Mastered by Ian Cooper at Metropolis Mastering, London
Sleeve art by Andrew Swainson
Thank you, thank you, Pamela Green, June Palmer, Vicky Kennedy, Rita Landre, Maxine, Harrison Marks and especially Rosina Revelle, but Erica is better than all of them.
Big thanks to Virgin Records for making this series possible.

References

Andy Partridge albums
Demo albums
2006 compilation albums